The Hunt may refer to:

Films
The Hunt (2006 film), an American science-fiction horror about hunters who encounter extraterrestrials
The Hunt (2012 film), a Danish drama directed by Thomas Vinterberg and starring Mads Mikkelsen
The Hunt (2016 film), a South Korean action thriller
The Hunt (2020 film), an American satirical horror thriller
La caza (Spanish for The Hunt), a 1966 Spanish film directed by Carlos Saura
AV The Hunt, a Turkish horror thriller

Television

"The Hunt" (The Twilight Zone), a 1962 episode of The Twilight Zone about a dead man whose fondness for his dog keeps him from going to hell
"The Hunt" (The Outer Limits), a 1998 episode about hunters and androids
"The Hunt" (The Wire), a 2002 episode of The Wire
"The Hunt" (Justified), a 2015 episode of Justified
The Hunt, 2002 documentary on the University of Chicago Scavenger Hunt
The Hunt with John Walsh, a 2014 program aimed for apprehending wanted criminals
The Hunt (2015 TV series), a BBC natural history series presented by David Attenborough
Hunters (2020 TV series), an American television series originally titled The Hunt
The Hunting, a 2019 Australian television series originally titled The Hunt

Music
 "The Hunt" ("Jagdquartett"), a nickname for String Quartet No. 17 (Mozart)
"The Hunt" ("Die Jagd"), a nickname for Beethoven's Piano Sonata No. 18 in E-flat Major, Op. 31 No. 3
The Hunt (Guv'ner album), 1996
The Hunt (Dexter Gordon album), 1947
The Hunt (band), Canadian rock band
The Hunt (band), NYC post-punk outfit on Sacred Bones Records, 2006–2010

Literature and theatre
The Hunt (book), by Carla Del Ponte
The Hunt (play), adapted from the 2012 film by David Farr, 2019
The Hunt, in the Age of Reptiles (comics) comic book series
The Hunt, a short story from Tales of Pirx the Pilot by  Stanisław Lem
The Hunt (1950s Stanisław Lem short story)

Other uses
 HUNT Study, a cohort health study in Norway
"The Hunt," colloquialism for Far Hills Races, a horserace in New Jersey, US

See also
Hunt (disambiguation)
Wild Hunt, a motif in European mythology